George Trimble House may refer to:

George Trimble House (Colonie, New York), listed on the NRHP in New York
George Trimble House (Mechanicsburg, Pennsylvania), listed on the NRHP in Pennsylvania

See also
Trimble House (disambiguation)